Avenell Heights is a suburb of Bundaberg in the Bundaberg Region, Queensland, Australia. In the  Avenell Heights had a population of 4,871 people.

Geography 
The North Coast railway line forms the western boundary of the suburb. The suburb is flat land used almost entirely for residential purposes with the exception of the Bundaberg Racecourse in the north-west of the suburb.

History 
The suburb was officially named by Queensland Place Names Board on 1 January 1967. It was officially bounded on 16 June 2000.

In the  Avenell Heights had a population of 4,871 people.

References 

Bundaberg Region